Krishnaleela is a 1947 Indian Kannada-language film, directed by C. V. Raju. The film stars Kemparaj Urs, Mari Rai, Bellary Lalitha and Bellary Rathnamala in the lead roles. The film has musical score by P. Kalinga Rao.

Cast
Kemparaj Urs as Kamsa
Mari Rai as Krishna
Bellary Lalitha
Bellary Rathnamala
Nagarathna
Kaantha as Radha
Prathima Devi as Gopi

References

External links
 

1940s Kannada-language films
Indian black-and-white films
Films about Krishna